Richard Angwin Rail (25 July 1888 – 9 October 1917) was an Australian-born South African first-class cricketer and British Army officer.

References

External links

1888 births
1917 deaths
Cricketers from Sydney
Australian emigrants to South Africa
South African cricketers
Western Province cricketers
South African military personnel of World War I
Coldstream Guards officers
South African military personnel killed in World War I